Stars in Your Eyes is a 1956 British musical film directed by Maurice Elvey.

Plot
As the world of vaudeville gradually loses its attraction, more and more entertainers are losing their jobs. In hopes of fixing their financial problems, a group of entertainers band together and buy a run-down theatre to attract customers by showcasing their various talents on the grand opening night. Along the way their show is threatened by a gang of crooks but the show finishes successfully with each entertainer given a happy ending.

Cast
 Nat Jackley as Jimmy Knowles
 Pat Kirkwood as Sally Bishop
 Bonar Colleano as David Laws
 Dorothy Squires as Ann Hart
 Jack Jackson as Cecil Rigby
 Vera Day as Maureen Temple
 Hubert Gregg as Crawley Walters
 Joan Sims as Walter's Secretary
 Ernest Clark as Ronnie
 Gerald Harper as Dicky
 Meier Tzelniker as Maxie Jago
 Gabrielle Brune as Effie
 Aubrey Dexter as Farrow
 Roger Avon as Grimes
 Jimmy Clitheroe as Joey

References

External links

1956 films
British musical films
Films directed by Maurice Elvey
Films with screenplays by Talbot Rothwell
1956 musical films
Films shot at MGM-British Studios
1950s English-language films
1950s British films